18 bästa is a compilation album by Swedish singer Carola Häggkvist, released on 29 December 2004. On the album charts, it peaked at number three in Sweden.

Track listing
"Främling"
"Mickey"
"Fångad av en stormvind"
"När löven faller"
"Mitt i ett äventyr"
"Tommy tycker om mig"
"Runaway"
"I Believe in Love"
"Brand New Heart"
"Light"
"Radiate"
"Kiss Goodbye"
"Walk a Mile in My Shoes"
"If I Can Dream"
"Modersvingen"
"Himlen i min famn"
"Jag vill alltid älska"
"Thula Sana"

References

Carola Häggkvist compilation albums
2004 compilation albums
Swedish-language albums
Universal Music Group compilation albums
Albums produced by Lasse Holm